Some American Folk Songs Like They Used To is an album by folk artist "Spider" John Koerner, released in 1974. The album is out of print.

Guests on the album include fellow Koerner, Ray & Glover members Dave "Snaker" Ray and Tony "Little Sun" Glover.

Track listing

Side one
 "The Farmer's Curst Wife"
 "The Dodger"
 "Hallelujah! I'm a Bum"
 "Stewball
 "The Young Man Who Wouldn't Hoe Corn"
 "Days of '49"
 "10,000 Years Ago"
 "Grunt 'n Groan and the New Cave"

Side two
 "Jack of Diamonds"
 "Abduloah Bulbul Amir"
 "Go Down Moses"
 "Casey Jones"
 "Danville Girl"
 "Careless Love"
 "When First unto This Country"
 "Grunt n' Groan and the New Wheel"

Personnel
"Spider" John Koerner – guitar, harmonica, vocals
Tony Glover – harmonica on "Stewball", "Jack of Diamonds", "Danville Girl" and "When First unto This Country"
Dave Ray – slide guitar, background vocals on "Stewball", "Jack of Diamonds" and "Danville Girl"

External links
John Koerner discography

1974 albums
John Koerner albums